In the field of mathematics known as functional analysis, the invariant subspace problem is a partially unresolved problem asking whether every bounded operator on a complex Banach space sends some non-trivial closed subspace to itself. Many variants of the problem have been solved, by restricting the class of bounded operators considered or by specifying a particular class of Banach spaces. The problem is still open for separable Hilbert spaces (in other words, each example, found so far, of an operator with no non-trivial invariant subspaces is an operator that acts on a Banach space that is not isomorphic to a separable Hilbert space).

History
The problem seems to have been stated in the mid-1900s after work by Beurling and von Neumann, who found (but never published) a positive solution for the case of compact operators. It was then posed by Paul Halmos for the case of operators  such that  is compact. This was resolved affirmatively, for the more general class of polynomially compact operators (operators  such that  is a compact operator for a suitably chosen non-zero polynomial ), by Allen R. Bernstein and Abraham Robinson in 1966 (see  for a summary of the proof).

For Banach spaces, the first example of an operator without an invariant subspace was constructed by Per Enflo. He proposed a counterexample to the invariant subspace problem in 1975, publishing an outline in 1976. Enflo submitted the full article in 1981 and the article's complexity and length delayed its publication to 1987 Enflo's long "manuscript had a world-wide circulation among mathematicians" and some of its ideas were described in publications besides Enflo (1976). Enflo's works inspired a similar construction of an operator without an invariant subspace for example by Beauzamy, who acknowledged Enflo's ideas.

In the 1990s, Enflo developed a "constructive" approach to the invariant subspace problem on Hilbert spaces.

Precise statement

A negative answer to the problem is closely related to properties of the  orbits . From the definition it follows that  is a -invariant subspace. Moreover, it is the minimal -invariant subspace containing : if  is another invariant subspace containing , then necessarily  for all  (since  is -invariant), and so .

Known special cases

While the case of the invariant subspace problem for separable Hilbert spaces is still open, several other cases have been settled for topological vector spaces (over the field of complex numbers):
For finite-dimensional complex vector spaces, every operator admits an eigenvector, so it has a 1-dimensional invariant subspace.
 The conjecture is true if the Hilbert space  is not separable (i.e. if it has an uncountable orthonormal basis).
von Neumann showed that any compact operator on a Hilbert space of dimension at least 2 has a non-trivial invariant subspace.
 The spectral theorem shows that all normal operators admit invariant subspaces.
  proved that every compact operator on any Banach space of dimension at least 2 has an invariant subspace.
  proved using non-standard analysis that if  the operator  on a Hilbert space is polynomially compact (in other words  is compact for some non-zero polynomial ) then  has an invariant subspace. Their proof uses the original idea of embedding the infinite-dimensional Hilbert space in a hyperfinite-dimensional Hilbert space (see Non-standard analysis#Invariant subspace problem).
 , after having seen Robinson's preprint, eliminated the non-standard analysis from it and provided a shorter proof in the same issue of the same journal.
  gave a very short proof using the Schauder fixed point theorem that if the operator  on a Banach space commutes with a non-zero compact operator then  has a non-trivial invariant subspace.  This includes the case of polynomially compact operators because an operator commutes with any polynomial in itself. More generally, he showed that if  commutes with a non-scalar operator  that commutes with a non-zero compact operator, then  has an invariant subspace.
Later  constructed an operator on  without even a non-trivial closed invariant subset, that is that for every vector  the set  is dense, in which case the vector is called hypercyclic (the difference with the case of cyclic vectors is that we are not taking the subspace generated by the points  in this case).
 gave an example of an operator without invariant subspaces on a nuclear Fréchet space.
 proved that any infinite dimensional Banach space of countable type over a non-Archimedean field admits a bounded linear operator without a non-trivial closed invariant subspace. This completely solves the non-Archimedean version of this problem, posed by van Rooij and Schikhof in 1992.
 gave the construction of an infinite-dimensional Banach space such that every continuous operator is the sum of a compact operator and a scalar operator, so in particular every operator has an invariant subspace.

Notes

References

 

 

 
 
 
 
 

Invariant subspaces 
Operator theory 
Functional analysis
Unsolved problems in mathematics
Mathematical problems